Zachee Ama Orji (born 1960) is a Nigerian actor, director, producer  and filmmaker known for his role in Nollywood movies Glamour Girls, and Blood Money. Aside from acting, Orji is a preacher.

Early History 
Zachee Ama Orji was born in Libreville, Gabon. He grew up in Cameroon, Benin and Togo where he learnt how to speak both English and French fluently. Orji is a graduate of University of Nigeria, Nsukka. His first movie was in 1991 and was entitled Unforgiven Sin. In an interview with Nollywood Post, Orji shared how he got the lead role in the movie without auditioning. Since then, Orji has starred in different movies and is now a Nollywood legend. He is also a singer and preacher of God's word since he found Christ.

He is married to Ngozi Orji has three children and lives in Nigeria.

In 2000, Zack Orji made his directorial debut with the movie titled WEB starring himself and Ghanaian actress, Kalsoume Sinare. The movie won best collaborative film in the Ghana awards of 2001.

In 2022, Zack made it known that he is supporting Tinubu for president in the 2023 presidential election.

Filmography 

 Women's Cot
Big Town
 Nneka the Pretty Serpent
 Sweet Face
 Our Jesus Story
 Asimo
 Lost Hope
Love Castle
Blood sisters
Glamour Girls
Blood money
Code Wilo

References

External links
An interview with Zack

1960 births
Living people
Nigerian male film actors
University of Nigeria alumni
Igbo male actors
Nigerian film directors
20th-century Nigerian male actors
21st-century Nigerian male actors
Nigerian male television actors
Nigerian film producers
20th-century births